Majeed syndrome is an inherited skin disorder characterized by chronic recurrent multifocal osteomyelitis, congenital dyserythropoietic anemia and a neutrophilic dermatosis. 
It is classified as an autoinflammatory bone disorder.
The condition is found in people with two defective copies (autosomal recessive inheritance) of the LPIN2 gene. LPIN2 encodes lipin-2 which is involved in lipid metabolism. 
The pathogenesis of this mutation with the clinical manifestations has not been elucidated.

Treatments 
Treatments for this disorder are often based on what symptoms are present in the patient. Most commonly prescribed treatments include nonsteroidal anti-inflammatory drugs (NSAIDs), as well as physical therapy in order to prevent from muscle atrophy in patients. Red blood transfusions could also be done for patients with severe congenital dyserythrypoietic anemia (CDA).

See also 
 TNF receptor associated periodic syndrome
 List of cutaneous conditions

References

External links
 

Autoinflammatory syndromes
Syndromes